Jerome Ravn Juhl (July 27, 1938 – September 25, 2005) was an American television and film writer, best known for his work with The Muppets.

Biography
Juhl was born in St. Paul, Minnesota; his family moved to Menlo Park, California, when he was 14. He received a bachelor's degree in theater arts from San Jose State University in 1961 and worked on children's shows for local television stations while in college. He met Frank Oz when they both worked for the Oakland Recreation Department's Vagabond Puppet Theater as teenagers. The two later met Henson at a puppeteer gathering in California.

Juhl was recruited by Jim Henson as a puppeteer and writer on Sam and Friends. He focused increasingly on writing as other puppeteers, such as Frank Oz, joined the Henson stable.

Juhl was the head writer on The Muppet Show from seasons 2 to 5 (season 1 had Jack Burns as head writer). He also wrote for the television shows Fraggle Rock and The Jim Henson Hour. He was involved in some capacity with all of the Muppet films from The Muppet Movie in 1979 to Muppets from Space in 1999. According to Lisa Henson, "So much of the humour, irreverence, caring and heart began with Jerry. He was, in many ways, the real voice of the Muppets."

He appeared as himself in the 1981 documentary Of Muppets and Men: The Making of The Muppet Show, the 1984 documentary Henson's Place, and the 1994 documentary The World of Jim Henson. In addition to being interviewed in all three, he also appeared in archival footage in the last two.

He was married to Susan Doerr Juhl and lived in Caspar, California. In his last few years he semi-retired from writing, but taught at local colleges and spoke at puppeteer conventions. He died on September 26, 2005 from pancreatic cancer at the age of 67.

Awards

Juhl co-wrote The Muppet Movie with Jack Burns, for which the two shared a Saturn Award nomination for Best Writing. He was nominated for a shared Emmy four times, for his writing on The Muppet Show, finally winning the award in 1981 for Outstanding Writing in a Variety, Music or Comedy Program. He was also awarded for his work on The Jim Henson Hour (Outstanding Children's Program, 1989, 1990) and The Muppets Celebrate Jim Henson (Outstanding Writing in a Variety or Music Program, 1991). His work on A Muppet Family Christmas won him the WGA Award for Variety – Musical, Award, Tribute, Special Event.

Filmography

References

External links
 
 An interview with Jerry Juhl
 A tribute to Jerry Juhl at IGN FilmForce
 A tribute to Jerry Juhl at Jim Hill Media

1938 births
2005 deaths
San Jose State University alumni
Deaths from pancreatic cancer
Muppet performers
American male screenwriters
American television writers
Emmy Award winners
Fraggle Rock
Sesame Street Muppeteers
Writers from Saint Paul, Minnesota
Sesame Street crew
Deaths from cancer in California
Writers Guild of America Award winners
American people of Danish descent
American male television writers
20th-century American male writers
20th-century American writers
20th-century American screenwriters